Canelas e Espiunca is a civil parish in the municipality of Arouca, Portugal. The population in 2011 was 1,183, in an area of 35.73 km². It was formed in 2013 by the merger of the former parishes Canelas and Espiunca.

References

Freguesias of Arouca, Portugal